David Conley may refer to:

David Conley (musician) (born 1953), American jazz flute player, songwriter, and producer
David Conley, Jr., contestant from The Amazing Race
David Ray Conley III, suspect in the 2015 Harris County shooting